A garter is an article of clothing used to hold up stockings.

Garter may also refer to:

Garter snake (Thamnophis), a genus of snakes endemic to North and Central America
Sleeve garter, worn on the sleeve of a shirt
Garter Principal King of Arms, the principal heraldic officer in the United Kingdom

See also
Order of the Garter